Bogdan Ilie Vătăjelu (born 24 April 1993) is a Romanian professional footballer who plays as a left-back or a winger for Liga I club Universitatea Craiova.

Club career

Early years
Vătăjelu is a product of the Steaua București youth academy and made his professional debut with the reserves in 2010. Making 25 appearances for the reserves, he joined CSM Râmnicu Vâlcea in 2011 playing there until 2013 in Liga II.

In 2013, he signed for Metalul Reșița where he had a brief spell playing in 14 outings. He was named the captain after playing just two matches. During his time in the club, it was reported that Premier League club Sunderland, Championship club Watford and even Spanish club RCD Mallorca showed their interest in signing him.

Universitatea Craiova
In January 2014, Vătăjelu penned a three-year deal with CS Universitatea Craiova, who were playing in the second league at that time. He made 14 appearances in the remainder of the season and helped his team achieve promotion to the Liga I.

Vătăjelu was Universitatea's most featured player in the 2014–15 season and in 2016 he eventually gained team captaincy. On 2 October 2016, he  scored from action in a 1–2 loss against his former club Steaua București.

Sparta Prague
On 27 December 2016, Vătăjelu signed a -year contract with Czech club Sparta Prague for an undisclosed transfer fee, rumoured to be around €1.4 million.

Return to Universitatea Craiova
On 26 June 2019, Vătăjelu rejoined Universitatea Craiova by signing a four-year contract.

International career
Between 2011 and 2012, he played for Romania under-19 team on four occasions. On 25 May 2014, while still in the second division, he was called to the senior national team for the friendlies against Algeria and Albania.

Honours
Universitatea Craiova
 Liga II: 2013–14
 Cupa României: 2020–21
 Supercupa României: 2021

References

External links
 
 
 
 

1993 births
Living people
Sportspeople from Râmnicu Vâlcea
Association football defenders
Romanian footballers
Romanian expatriate footballers
FC Steaua II București players
SCM Râmnicu Vâlcea players
CS Sportul Snagov players
CS Universitatea Craiova players
AC Sparta Prague players
Liga I players
Liga II players
Czech First League players
Romanian expatriate sportspeople in the Czech Republic
FK Jablonec players
Expatriate footballers in the Czech Republic